The  Gira Aras massacre was a mass extrajudicial killing that took place in Gira Aras in the Tigray Region of Ethiopia during the Tigray War, around 22 April 2021. Gira Aras is a village that belongs to woreda Hawzen, Eastern zone of Tigray.

Massacre
The Ethiopian National Defense Force (ENDF) killed twelve civilians in Gira Aras (Eastern Tigray) on 22 April 2021.

Typical massacres committed by Ethiopian and Eritrean soldiers in the Tigray war are (1) revenge when they lose a battle; (2) to terrorise and extract information about whereabouts of TPLF leaders; (3) murder of suspected family members of TDF fighters; and (4) terrorising the Tigray society as a whole such as in case of mass killings in churches.

Perpetrators
Witnesses reported the perpetrators of this massacre as being Ethiopian soldiers.

Victims
The “Tigray: Atlas of the humanitarian situation” mentions twelve victims of this massacre, eleven of whom have been identified.

Reactions
The “Tigray: Atlas of the humanitarian situation”, that documented this massacre received international media attention, particularly regarding its Annex A, that lists massacres in the Tigray War.

After months of denial by the Ethiopian authorities that massacres occurred in Tigray, a joint investigation by OHCHR and the Ethiopian Human Rights Commission was announced in March 2021.

References

External links
World Peace Foundation: Starving Tigray

2021 massacres of the Tigray War
April 2021 crimes in Africa